The Ministry of Education (MINED) is a government ministry of El Salvador, headquartered in San Salvador.

References

External links
  Ministry of Education
Education in El Salvador
Government of El Salvador
Education ministries